is a feminine Japanese given name that means "child of bliss." It also means "happiness" when it is written with the kanji characters 幸子. One common short form of the name is Sachi.

People
 Sachiko, Princess Hisa (久宮祐子内親王, 1927–1928), Japanese princess
, Japanese cult leader and serial killer
 Sachiko Murata (born 1943), Japanese academic
, Japanese shogi player
 Sachiko Yamada, pseudonym used by kidnap victim Fusako Sano

Arts
 Sachiko Chijimatsu (千々松 幸子, born 1937), Japanese voice actress
 Sachiko Hamano (浜野佐知子, born 1948), Japanese pink film director
 Sachiko Kamachi (蒲池幸子, 1967–2007), birth name of Japanese singer and model Izumi Sakai
 Sachiko Kamimura (神村 幸子), Japanese animator
 Sachiko Kodama, Japanese sculpture artist
 Sachiko Kojima (小島幸子, born 1979), Japanese voice actress
 Sachiko Kokubu (国分 佐智子, born 1976), Japanese actress and model
 Sachiko M, Japanese experimental musician
 Sachiko Murase (村瀬幸子, 1905–1993), Japanese film actress
 Sachi Parker (born 1956), American actress, daughter of actress Shirley MacLaine
 Sachiko Suzuki (鈴木早智子, born 1969), Japanese singer

Sports
 Sachiko Fukunaka (福中 佐知子, born 1968), Japanese former volleyball player
 Sachiko Fujita (藤田 幸子, born 1968), Japanese volleyball and beach volleyball player
 Sachiko Ito (伊藤 幸子, born 1975), Japanese softball player
 Sachiko Jumonji (十文字 幸子, born 1989), Japanese professional wrestler
, Japanese long jumper
 Sachiko Konishi (小西 祥子, born 1982), Japanese racewalker
 Sachiko Masumi (桝見 咲智子, born 1984), Japanese long jumper
 Sachiko Otani (大谷 佐知子, born 1965), Japanese volleyball player
 Sachiko Sugiyama (杉山 祥子, born 1979), Japanese volleyball player
 Sachiko Saito (斎藤 幸子, born 1947), Japanese speed skater
 Sachiko Yamada (swimmer) (山田沙知子, born 1982), Japanese swimmer
, Japanese alpine skier
 Sachiko Yamashita (山下 佐知子, born 1964), Japanese long-distance runner
, Japanese swimmer
, Japanese table tennis player

Fictional characters
 Juraku Sachiko (聚楽 幸子), is the main antagonist in the gambling spin-off series, Kakegurui Twin. She is the former Public Morals Committee Chairwoman of the Student Council at Hyakkaou Private Academy.
 Sachiko (幸子), the second-eldest Makioka sister in the novel The Makioka Sisters
 Shinozaki Sachiko (篠崎 サチコ), the antagonist in the dōjin soft video game series Corpse Party
 Sachiko, a character in the psychological thriller novel The Asylum for Wayward Victorian Girls
 Sachiko (software), a Vocaloid vocal released for Vocaloid 4.
 Sachiko, from the "NANA" anime.
 Sachiko, title character of novel (1982) by Shusaku Endo

Japanese feminine given names